Hereford High School is a four-year public high school located in the rural northern Baltimore County town of Parkton, Maryland, United States, as part of the Baltimore County Public Schools (BCPS). The secondary school was established in 1953.

The school's district is the Hereford Zone. Like those of most public schools in the region, Hereford students are transported by a busing system.

Hereford is notable for its agriscience program. It was the only one of its kind among the county's public high schools. Hereford's base feeder school, Hereford Middle School, also has a smaller agricultural program.

History
The Agricultural High School was opened by then rural Baltimore County in Sparks, Maryland in 1909 and had its first graduating class in 1912.  The name was changed to Sparks High School around 1920, and it was converted into an elementary school in 1953.  Hereford High School was established in nearby Parkton, Maryland to replace Sparks High School in 1953. It originally was home to a large population of farmers' children in northern Baltimore County due to the fact that at one time, Hereford's economy was almost entirely agriculture based. Since then, the disappearance of small farms and the growth of exurban housing development has caused the high school's agrarian roots to be carried on mostly by local tradition and its agricultural courses.

Academics
Hereford High school received a 69.9 out of a possible 90 points (77%) on the 2018-2019 Maryland State Department of Education Report Card and received a 5 out of 5 star rating, ranking in the 88th percentile among all Maryland schools. The Maryland Department of Education certified Hereford High School as a Blue Ribbon School on December 15, 2015.

Students
The 2019–2020 enrollment at Hereford High School was 1295 students.

Departments

Music
The music programs of Hereford High include the following:
Concert (freshman) and Symphonic (upperclassman) Orchestra
Concert (freshman) and Symphonic (upperclassman) Band (Winds)
Chorus (men's, women's) (freshmen, upperclassman)
Chamber Choir (for upperclassmen only)
"Bulltones" (by audition, male choir)
"Ladies Faire" (by audition, female choir)
Jazz Ensemble
Guitar
AP Music Theory
various music technology courses
Pep Band (for Basketball and Football games)
Pit Orchestras (for the Winter musical)

Along with its counterpart female choral group, "Ladies Fare", the "Bulltones" perform at a variety of events, visiting schools in the vicinity as well as competing in notable locations such as Boston, Montreal, and Nashville.

In 2007, the Hereford High School Symphonic Band performed Chorus Angelorum by composer Samuel R. Hazo. The piece was commissioned for the Symphonic Winds section two years prior, after the death of Joey and Audrey Baseman (whose siblings and grandchildren were in the band).

Art

The National Art Honor Society chapter at H.H.S. provides services such as face-painting for the homecoming dance, sponsorship of Youth Art Month activities, assistance at after-school art programs in the area, a House of Ruth (shelter for abused women) art supply fund, and more. It also hosts the high school's annual art auction and show, which exhibits student work.

Theatre

Several levels of Theatre classes are available to schedule. The department usually produces two to three shows each school year. Previously, Hereford partook in the Cappies program in the Baltimore area. But left the program in the 2012–2013 season. In the past, they have won awards for Best Musical (Pippin), Best Supporting Actor in a Musical (Adam Ziegel in Thoroughly Modern Millie), Best Comedic Actress (Taylor Page in Thoroughly Modern Millie), Best Female Vocalist (Katherine Crowe in Pirates of Penzance and Julienne Gede in The Secret Garden), Best Costumes (Abby Urbanas, Steph Parks, Hannah Morgan in The Secret Garden and Kaitlin Philipp, Laura Pederson in Pippin), Lead Actress in a Musical (Mika Kauffman in Seussical) and, under the direction in past years of Lee Waters, members of the theatre program as well as the program as a whole won a number of awards at the All State Theatre Festival, held annually at Magruder High School in Montgomery County. Because of this continually evolving program, the actors have been able to perform songs on the stage at the landmark Hippodrome Theatre on Eutaw Street in downtown Baltimore. They have also won awards at the yearly trip to the Pennsylvania Renaissance Festival. Other theatre related extracurricular activities include the Improv Troupe and Drama Club.

Athletics
The mascot of Hereford is the bull, due to the region's rich agrarian history.

Hereford High plays in the state league Maryland Public Secondary Schools Athletic Association (MPSSAA), and has won over 50 state athletic championships, more than any other school in Baltimore County. Hereford has also won the second most state championships in the Baltimore metro area, second only to Oakland Mills High in Columbia, Maryland in neighboring Howard County:

State Championships
Girls Cross Country
Class B 1978, 1979, 1980
2A 2004, 2005, 2013, 2015, 2016, 2017, 2018, 2021
3A 2010, 2011, 2015
Boys Cross Country
Class B 1957, 1958, 1959, 1960, 1962, 1968, 1970, 1971, 1974, 1976, 1977, 1978
3A 2010, 2011, 2012
Class 2A Sportsmanship Awards 2017
Field Hockey
Class B 1979
1A 1998 TIE
2A 2001 TIE, 2004, 2006, 2014, 2015, 2016
3A 2009
Football
1A 1997
2A, 2001, 2002
Girls Soccer
2A 2000 TIE
Boys Soccer
1A 1987 TIE, 1988 TIE
2A 1989 TIE, 2013
Steve Malone Sportsmanship Award 2009
Volleyball
Combined Class AA/A/B/C 1975
Class B 1979
Girls Indoor Track
3A 2012, 2013
2A 2016, 2017, 2019, 2020
Boys Indoor Track
Class B-C 1980
Wrestling
Combined Class 1970
Girls Lacrosse
2A-1A 2001, 2002, 2003
Sportsmanship Award 2002
Boys Lacrosse
2A-1A 1996, 2003
3A-2A-1A 2000
3A-2A 2008, 2009, 2010, 2011, 2012, 2013
Softball
Eugene Robertson Sportsmanship Award 2004 TIE, 2007
Girls Track and Field
2A 2019

Cross country
Hereford High is the host of the annual Bull Run Invitational Cross Country Meet, run in the end of September, which is one of the largest East Coast cross country running events, attracting over 100 schools from surrounding states. The course is noted for its hills, twists, turns and a steep ravine known as "The Dip", all making for what has been called "The Toughest Three Miles in Cross-Country" by John Dye of DyeStat.

Track and field
In May 2006, Hereford High School initiated a controversial appeal of a ruling in the Class 2A state championship in girls' track.  The initial ruling had upheld the victory of Alison Smith in the 1600-meter race, denying a claim that Paralympic medalist Tatyana McFadden, a wheelchair athlete, had assisted teammate Smith by pacing her.  The consequential disqualification of McFadden and Smith by the Jury of Appeals of the State Games Committee cost defending champion Atholton High School the title.

Notable people

 Jennifer S. Baker, Director of Athletics and Recreation at Johns Hopkins University
 Andrew DePaola (Class of 2005), NFL football player
 Carl Runk, lacrosse coach
 Suzanne Stettinius (Class of 2006), modern pentathlete representing the United States at the 2012 Olympics.

References

External links
Official site
Baltimore County Public Schools

Public high schools in Maryland
Baltimore County Public Schools
Educational institutions established in 1954
Middle States Commission on Secondary Schools
1954 establishments in Maryland